The Jupiter Formation is a geologic formation in Quebec, well-exposed in the southern third of Anticosti Island and lying in the St Lawrence River Valley. It preserves fossils dating back to the Silurian period.

Fossil content

Trace Fossils

Vertebrates

Invertebrates

See also

 List of fossiliferous stratigraphic units in Quebec

References

 

Silurian Quebec
Silurian southern paleotemperate deposits
Silurian southern paleotropical deposits